Clement Power (born 20 August 1980 in London) is a British conductor.

Education
After studies of piano, violin and composition, Power read music at Gonville and Caius College, Cambridge, and conducting at the Royal College of Music, London.

Career
After a season (2005–06) as assistant conductor to the London Philharmonic Orchestra, Power was named assistant conductor (2006–08) of the Ensemble Intercontemporain, Paris, where he worked with Pierre Boulez and Susanna Mälkki. Known for his interpretations of the major works of the twentieth and twenty-first centuries, Power frequently collaborates with leading new-music ensembles including Klangforum Wien and MusikFabrik. He has conducted orchestras including the Philharmonia, the London Philharmonic Orchestra, BBC Scottish Symphony Orchestra, NHK Symphony Orchestra, RSO Stuttgart, Lucerne Festival Academy Orchestra, Orchestre Philharmonique du Luxembourg, Estonian National Symphony Orchestra, Orchestre de Bretagne, Ensemble Intercontemporain, Ensemble Contrechamps, Avanti! Chamber Orchestra, Ictus Ensemble, Ensemble Modern, Birmingham Contemporary Music Group, and the Munich Chamber Orchestra. He has been the guest of festivals including Lucerne Festival, Salzburg Biennale, Darmstadt, Wien Modern, IRCAM Agora, and the Venice Biennale, amongst many others. Power has given over two hundred world premieres, including works by Georg Friedrich Haas, Péter Eötvös, Benedict Mason, and new operas by Hèctor Parra (Hypermusic Prologue, Ensemble Intercontemporain / Liceu), Wolfgang Mitterer (Marta, Opéra de Lille), and Liza Lim (Tree of Codes, Cologne Opera).

Discography
Hèctor Parra, Hypermusic Prologue – Ensemble intercontemporain – KAIROS 0013042KAI, 2010
Gerald Resch, Collection Serti — Klangforum Wien – KAIROS 0013282KAI, 2012
Marko Nikodijevic, dark/rooms — Ensemble musikFabrik – Col Legno 40408, 2013
Agata Zubel, Not I — Klangforum Wien — KAIROS 0013362KAI, 2014
ConNotations (Alban Berg - Kammerkonzert), Britten Sinfonia, Mei Yi Foo, Bartosz Woroch – Orchid Classics, 2017
Christoph Renhart, Edition Zeitton - Klangforum Wien - ORF ORF-CD 3218, 2017
Edition Musikfabrik 16, Fall — WERGO WER68692, 2019
Edition Musikfabrik 17, Erbe — WERGO WER68702, 2019

References

External links

British male conductors (music)
1980 births
Alumni of the Royal College of Music
Living people
Musicians from London
Alumni of Gonville and Caius College, Cambridge
21st-century British conductors (music)
21st-century British male musicians